Héctor Milián (born 1968) is a Cuban wrestler. He won an Olympic gold medal in Greco-Roman wrestling in 1992. He won a gold medal at the 1991 World Wrestling Championships.

References

External links
 Héctor Milián at the United World Wrestling Database
 

1968 births
Living people
Olympic wrestlers of Cuba
Wrestlers at the 1992 Summer Olympics
Wrestlers at the 1996 Summer Olympics
Wrestlers at the 2000 Summer Olympics
Cuban male sport wrestlers
Olympic gold medalists for Cuba
Olympic medalists in wrestling
Medalists at the 1992 Summer Olympics
Pan American Games medalists in wrestling
Pan American Games gold medalists for Cuba
Wrestlers at the 1987 Pan American Games
Wrestlers at the 1991 Pan American Games
Wrestlers at the 1995 Pan American Games
Wrestlers at the 1999 Pan American Games
World Wrestling Championships medalists
Medalists at the 1987 Pan American Games
Medalists at the 1991 Pan American Games
Medalists at the 1995 Pan American Games
Medalists at the 1999 Pan American Games
20th-century Cuban people
21st-century Cuban people